Noble "Thin Man" Watts (February 17, 1926 – August 24, 2004) was an American blues, jump blues and rhythm and blues saxophonist. He primarily played tenor saxophone. The AllMusic journalist, Bill Dahl, considered Watts "one of the most incendiary [...] fire-breathing tenor sax honkers" of the 1950s.

Biography
Born in DeLand, Florida, Watts studied violin and trumpet in his youth, later switching to sax. He gained musical training at Florida A&M, where he played in the school's marching band with future saxophonist Cannonball Adderley. Hired to play with The Griffin Brothers after college, Watts began his professional career.  During the 1950s, he would work with Lionel Hampton, Paul "Hucklebuck" Williams, Dinah Washington, Jerry Lee Lewis, Buddy Holly, Chuck Berry, the Everly Brothers, and others. He also appeared on American Bandstand with Johnny Mathis in 1957, and performed in the house band at a Harlem club owned by boxer Sugar Ray Robinson.

Watts's career would eventually decline by the mid-1960s. He played lounge music in parts of Florida before being "rediscovered" by record producer Bob Greenlee. He made a minor comeback in 1987, and worked for Greenlee's record label.

In 2004 Watts died of a combination of pneumonia and emphysema. He is survived by his wife June and daughter, Natalie Watts Brown.

Discography

As leader/co-leader
1987: Return of the Thin Man
1990: Noble & Nat – Noble "Thin Man" Watts and Nat Adderley
1993: King of the Boogie Sax
2019: Honkin', Shakin' & Slidin' (A Singles Collection 1954–1962) (Jasmine)

As sideman
1988: That Woman Is Poison! - Rufus Thomas
1989: Lucky Strikes! - Lucky Peterson
1990: Louisiana Legend - Raful Neal
1994: Goin' Back to Daytona - Floyd Miles

References

External links

Orlando Sentinel obituary
 

1926 births
2004 deaths
People from DeLand, Florida
Rhythm and blues saxophonists
Vee-Jay Records artists
Jump blues musicians
Deaths from emphysema
East Coast blues musicians
Florida A&M University alumni
American blues saxophonists
20th-century American musicians
20th-century saxophonists
Blues musicians from Florida
Alligator Records artists